Complexo Desportivo da Covilhã (Covilhã Sports Complex) is a multi-use stadium in Covilhã, Portugal. The Complexo Desportivo da Covilhã stadium holds 3,000 seats and the entire space has also infrastructure for volleyball, badminton and athletics (there's a track in the stadium). It also has several support equipment for the practice of professional and amateur sports. It was inaugurated in July 2003. It has been used for football matches and was a home stadium of SC Covilhã football team for several years between 2005 and 2014.

Portugal national football team

2010
The following national team matches were held in the stadium as preparations for the World Cup 2010.

References

Football venues in Portugal
S.C. Covilhã
Buildings and structures in Castelo Branco District
Buildings and structures in Covilhã
Sports venues completed in 2003